The National Basketball League Rookie of the Year was an annual National Basketball League (NBL) award given between 1983 and 2022 to the top rookie of the regular season. Traditionally for a player to be considered for Rookie of the Year, they must have been an unrestricted non-import player without previous professional experience. This rule was relaxed in 2020 when American Next Star LaMelo Ball was named Rookie of the Year.

The award was discontinued in 2023 following the introduction of the Next Generation Award.

Winners 

|}

References

Rookie of the Year
Awards established in 1983
Rookie player awards